Khalil Ismail Makrani (12 December 1935 – 4 April 2021), popularly known by his pen-name, Khalil Dhantejvi was a poet and novelist from Gujarat, India. He wrote poems in Gujarati and Urdu. He was awarded the Padma Shri in 2022 by government of India.

Biography 

Khalil Dhantejvi was born as Khalil Ismail Makrani on 12 December 1935 at Dhantej, a village in Vadodara. He studied till 4th standard. He adopted his pen name Khalil Dhantejvi after his village Dhantej.

He died on 4 April 2021 at Vadodara.

Works 
His published books are:

Poetry collection 
 Sadgi
 Saransh (2008)
 Sarovar (2018)
 Sogat
 Sooryamukhi
 Sayba
 Sanvariyo
 Sagpan
 Sopan
 Sarangi

Novels 
 Dr. Rekha (1974)
 Tarasya Ekant (1980)
 Min Ni Angalie Sooraj Ugyo (1984)
 Lila Pandade Pankhar (1986)
 Sannata Ni Chis (1987)
 Saav Adhura Lok (1991)
 Lilochham Tadko (1994)
 Sunvalo Dankh
 Kori Kori Bhinash
 Mot Malke Mithu Mithu

Awards 
Dhantejvi received the Kalapi Award in 2004 and the Vali Gujarati Gazal Award in 2013. In 2019, he received the Narsinh Mehta Award. He was awarded the Padma Shri posthumously by the Government of India in 2022 for his contribution in field of literature and education.

See also
 List of Gujarati-language writers

References 

1935 births
2021 deaths
20th-century Indian poets
20th-century Indian male writers
Gujarati-language poets
Indian male poets
Novelists from Gujarat
People from Vadodara
Poets from Gujarat
Recipients of the Padma Shri in literature & education